Margus Tammekivi (born 23 January 1956) is an Estonian lawyer, politician and sports figure. He was a member of XI Riigikogu.

Margus Tammekivi was born in Kõpu. After graduating from secondary school in Karksi-Nuia in 1974, he attended Tartu State University, Department of Law, graduating in 1979. 

Tammekivi has worked in Pärnu as an investigator, prosecutor and lawyer. He is a former Chairman of the Pärnu Council from 1989 until 1993 and again from 2002 2005.  He was the Deputy Mayor Pärnu from 2000 until 2002 and again from 2005–2007. In 2007, he was an alternate member of the XI Riigikogu, representing the Estonian Centre Party.

References

Living people
1956 births
20th-century Estonian lawyers
Estonian people in sports
Estonian Centre Party politicians
Members of the Riigikogu, 2007–2011
University of Tartu alumni
People from Põhja-Sakala Parish
21st-century Estonian lawyers